Erythrina atitlanensis is a species of legume in the family Fabaceae. It is found only in Guatemala.

References

External links
 
 

atitlanensis